Andrea Crisanti (12 June 1936, in Rome – 7 May 2012) was an Italian production designer and art director.

Crisanti studied art at the Academy of Fine Arts in Rome. He began his film career as assistant set designer to Mario Garbuglia by working on the set of The Great War (1959) with Mario Monicelli. His independent debut came with Maciste in Hell (1962) by Riccardo Freda.

In 1970, Crisanti met Francesco Rosi, which proved crucial to the success of his career.
He later worked on Cinema Paradiso (1988) and A Pure Formality (1994) by Giuseppe Tornatore, which won a David di Donatello Award. Sicily was one of his favourite places, and he recalled the pomp of the 17-century Bourbon period for the set of The Council of Egypt (2002) by Emidio Greco. Crisanti worked on Michelangelo Antonioni's Identification of a Woman (1982), Franzo Zeffirelli's Young Toscanini (1988), Gianni Amelio's The Stolen Children (1992), and Andrei Tarkovsky's Nostalghia (1983).

He taught art at Rome's Experimental Cinematography Centre from 1995 until his death, and was president of A.S.C., the Set and Costume Designers Association.

Filmography

Production Designer
 Chronicle of a Death Foretold (1988)
 Cinema Paradiso (1988)
 Swallows Never Die in Jerusalem (1994)
 Colpo di luna (1995)
 A Pure Formality (1995)
 The Truce (1997)
 Vipera (2001)
 The Emperor's New Clothes (2001)
 Sotto falso nome (2004)
 Cuore Sacro (2005)
 Face Addict (documentary, 2005)
 La Masseria Delle Allodole (2007)

Art Director
 The Mattei Affair, 1972)
 Lucky Luciano (1973)
 Illustrious Corpses (1976)
 Tre Tigri Contro Tre Tigri (1977)
 Christ Stopped at Eboli (1978)
 A Leap in the Dark (1980)
 Identification of a Woman (1982)
 Nostalghia (1983)
 Devil in the Flesh (1986)
 Young Toscanini (1988)
 The Palermo Connection (1990)
 Everybody's Fine (1990)
 The Stolen Children (1993)

Other
 Three Brothers (1981)
 Talcum Powder (1982)
 No Grazie, Il Caffe' Mi Rende Nervoso (1982)

Awards and recognition
BAFTA Awards
 1991: Nominated for a BAFTA Film Award in the Best Production Design category for Cinema Paradiso (1988)

David di Donatello Awards
 2006: Nominated in the category Best Production Design (Migliore Scenografo) for The Goodbye Kiss (2006)
 2005: Won in the category Best Production Design (Migliore Scenografo) for Cuore Sacro (2005)
 1995: Won in the category Best Production Design (Migliore Scenografo) for A Pure Formality (1994)

Italian National Syndicate of Film Journalists
 2007: Nominated for a Silver Ribbon in the category Best Production Design (Migliore Scenografia) for The Lark Farm (2007)
 2006: Nominated for a Silver Ribbon in the category Best Production Design (Migliore Scenografia) for Cuore Sacro (2005)
 2003: Nominated for a Silver Ribbon in the category Best Production Design (Migliore Scenografia) for The Window Opposite (2003)
 2002: Won a Silver Ribbon in the category Best Production Design (Migliore Scenografia) for The Council of Egypt'' (2002)

References

External links
 

1936 births
2012 deaths
Italian art directors
Film people from Rome
Italian production designers
Academic staff of the Centro Sperimentale di Cinematografia
David di Donatello winners